is a passenger railway station in located in the town of Katsuragi, Wakayama Prefecture, Japan, operated by West Japan Railway Company (JR West).

Lines
Kaseda Station is served by the Wakayama Line, and is located 58.2 kilometers from the terminus of the line at Ōji Station.

Station layout
The station consists of two side platforms connected to the station building by a footbridge. The station is staffed.

Platforms

Adjacent stations

|-
!colspan=5|West Japan Railway Company

History
Kaseda Station opened on November 25, 1900. With the privatization of the Japan National Railways (JNR) on April 1, 1987, the station came under the aegis of the West Japan Railway Company.

Passenger statistics
In fiscal 2019, the station was used by an average of 736 passengers daily (boarding passengers only).

Surrounding Area
 Katsuragi Town Tourist Information Center (adjacent to the station building)
 Wakayama Prefectural Kasada High School
 Katsuragi Municipal Kasedahigashi Junior High School
 Katsuragi Municipal Kasedahigashi Elementary School

See also
List of railway stations in Japan

References

External links

 Kaseda Station Official Site

Railway stations in Wakayama Prefecture
Railway stations in Japan opened in 1900
Katsuragi, Wakayama